Dalscote is a small village in West Northamptonshire, England. It is north of Towcester and between Gayton and Eastcote. There is a car-body repair workshop there but no other amenities. It is in the civil parish of Pattishall .

External links 

Villages in Northamptonshire
West Northamptonshire District